Ben Ehrenreich (born 1972) is an American freelance journalist and novelist who lives in Los Angeles.

Career
Ehrenreich began working as a journalist in the alternative press in the late 1990s, publishing extensively in  LA Weekly and The Village Voice. His journalism, essays and criticism have since appeared in Harper's, The New York Times Magazine, The Nation, the Los Angeles Times, The Believer, and the London Review of Books. He has reported from Afghanistan, Haiti, Cambodia, El Salvador, Mexico and all over the United States. In 2011, he was awarded a National Magazine Award in feature writing for an article published in Los Angeles magazine.

His first novel, The Suitors, was published by Counterpoint Press in 2006. Reviewing it, the American Library Association named him "a writer to watch" while Publishers Weekly called him "an original talent." Writing in BOMB, the novelist Frederic Tuten called The Suitors “truly a ravishing book.” Ehrenreich's short fiction has appeared in McSweeney's, BOMB, Black Clock and many other publications.

Ehrenreich also teaches in the graduate writing program at Otis College of Art and Design.

In 2016, he released another book, The Way to the Spring: Life and Death in Palestine, describing life in the Palestinian village of Nabi Salih and the villagers' struggle against the encroaching Israeli settlement of Halamish. The book was praised by The Economist with the conclusion that "It should be read by friends and foes of Israel alike." A review in The New York Times called it a "weighty contribution to the Palestinian side of the scales of history."

In 2020, he released Desert Notebooks: A Road Map for the End of Time. The Los Angeles Times described the book as "a hybrid memoir, travelogue and metaphysical enquiry." The New York Times concluded that Ehrenreich has "built a potent memorial to our own ongoing end-times."

Personal
Ehrenreich is the son of best-selling author Barbara Ehrenreich (Nickel and Dimed) and psychologist John Ehrenreich, and his sister is law professor Rosa Brooks.

Written works

References

External links

benehrenreich.net official website
Los Angeles Times Book Review, November 6, 2011
Everything You See Is Real, short story in BOMB, Spring 2009
The Long Goodbye, article about the poet Frank Stanford, January 2008.
The End, article in Los Angeles magazine, December 2010.
In the Heart of the Homeland, article about border militarization in Arizona in Slake, issue two.
Los Angeles Times Op-Ed, "Zionism is the Problem", March 15, 2009.
Death on Terminal Island, article in Los Angeles magazine, September 2008.
New York Times Book Review, May 14, 2006
Truth (ii), short story in SmokeLong Quarterly, December 15, 2007
Interview in SmokeLong Quarterly, December 15, 2007
Jar of Marbles short story in Significant Objects, November 2, 2009.

Living people
American male journalists
Journalists from California
21st-century American novelists
1972 births
Writers from Los Angeles
American male novelists
21st-century American male writers
21st-century American non-fiction writers
20th-century American Jews
21st-century American Jews